Israrullah (born 15 January 1990) is a Pakistani cricketer who plays for Khyber Pakhtunkhwa. He was the leading run-scorer for Peshawar in the 2017–18 Quaid-e-Azam Trophy, with 373 runs in six matches.

Biography
Israrullah was born in Monzai, Khyber Pakhtunkhwa.

In April 2018, he was named in Khyber Pakhtunkhwa's squad for the 2018 Pakistan Cup. He was also the leading run-scorer for Peshawar in the 2018–19 Quaid-e-Azam Trophy, with 624 runs in ten matches. In March 2019, he was named in Federal Areas' squad for the 2019 Pakistan Cup.

In January 2021, he was named in Khyber Pakhtunkhwa's squad for the 2020–21 Pakistan Cup.

References

External links
 

1990 births
Living people
Pakistani cricketers
Khyber Pakhtunkhwa cricketers
Peshawar cricketers